The 1994–95 season was Port Vale's 83rd season of football in the English Football League, and first ever season in the First Division following their promotion from the Second Division. John Rudge led his team to safety in the league, whilst reaching the Second Round of the FA Cup and League Cup. In the FA Cup they recorded a 6–0 victory over Hartlepool United, before suffering a shock defeat at Scarborough. Back in the same league as rivals Stoke City, they earned the season's bragging rights with a 1–1 draw at Vale Park and a 1–0 win at the Victoria Ground. Martin Foyle was the Player of the Year, having bagged twenty goals in all competitions. Club legend Ian Taylor had been sold before a ball was kicked, but new legends were born with the signatures of Tony Naylor, Steve Guppy, and Ian Bogie.

Overview

First Division
The pre-season saw John Rudge spend a small amount of the money received on the sales of Ian Taylor and Peter Swan to bring Tony Naylor to the club from Crewe Alexandra for a £150,000 fee. A further £200,000 was splashed out on Nottingham Forest forward Lee Glover. Another £4,500 was spent on Dutch goalkeeper Arjan van Heusden from VV Noordwijk. Arriving on free transfers were Craig Lawton (Manchester United) and Stewart Talbot (Moor Green).

The season started modestly, with two wins in the four August games. In September only Lee Glover, Tony Naylor and Martin Foyle could find the net, but the Vale won six points from their five games. To help with his recovery from a serious injury, Ray Walker spent some time on loan at Cambridge United, and won back his first team place in the Vale starting eleven upon his return. Meanwhile, Tony Kelly arrived at the club from Bolton Wanderers, but after a brief spell moved on to Millwall. Vale's poor attack was highlighted in October, though the defence ensured three draws from five games. In November, Darren Hughes was allowed to leave the club for Northampton Town. Rudge decided to make another big signing, and bought winger Steve Guppy from Newcastle United for £225,000. On 5 November, Vale lost all their inhibitions in front of goal, beating Southend United 5–0 with five different scorers. However their draw with Swindon Town would prove to be the only point gained in December, as Vale were stuck in a relegation dogfight. John Jeffers spent January on loan at Shrewsbury Town. During this spell defender Kevin Scott arrived on loan from Tottenham Hotspur. The team gelled, forming a five-game unbeaten run based on just two goals conceded to shoot up the table. In March, midfielder Ian Bogie was signed from Leyton Orient for a £50,000 fee. Potteries derby day finally came on 14 March, and 19,510 turned up at Vale Park to witness a 1–1 draw with Stoke City, Naylor scoring the Vale's goal. Five defeats in seven games followed, raising concerns of the drop. However the Vale were unbeaten in their final five games to ensure safety. This included a 3–3 draw at Elm Park that saw the "Valiants" come from three goals down to claim a point. It also included a 1–0 win over Stoke at the Victoria Ground on 22 April, Foyle scoring the goal.

They finished in seventeenth place with 58 points, leaving them ten points clear of relegated Swindon Town. They were five points short of Stoke, who finished six places above the Vale. Player of the Year Martin Foyle bagged twenty goals, double that of his nearest rival Tony Naylor.

At the end of the season Ollie Heald, Peter Billing, Mark Burke and John Burndred were released, who signed with Scarborough, Hartlepool United, Fortuna Sittard and Stafford Rangers respectively. Joe Allon was also sold to Brentford for £42,500.

Finances
The club's shirt sponsors were Tunstall Assurance.

Cup competitions
As members of the second tier, Vale should have qualified for the Third Round of the FA Cup, but were forced to take part in the First Round to make up the numbers after Aldershot went bust and Maidstone United resigned from the league. Vale went on to easily beat Third Division side Hartlepool United 6–0 in Burslem, with Martin Foyle bagging a hat-trick. Remarkably, this would be the last hat-trick scored by a Vale player at Vale Park until April 2011. However a shock awaited in the Second Round, where Scarborough, also of the fourth tier, beat the Vale 1–0 at the McCain Stadium.

In the League Cup, Vale advanced past Second Division Bristol Rovers 4–2 on aggregate, having won 3–1 at the Memorial Stadium. In the Second Round they faced Premier League Manchester United. Alex Ferguson's "Red Devils" beat John Rudge's "Valiants" 2–1 at Vale Park in front of 18,605 supporters; Lee Glover scoring for Vale and Paul Scholes scoring a brace on his United debut. At the time Vale fans were disappointed to witness the then-unknown United reserves, though Scholes would go on to become a household name, as would teenage teammates Gary Neville, Nicky Butt, and David Beckham; the United first eleven would go on to win a combined total of more than 500 international caps over the course of their careers. For the second leg there were 31,615 fans at Old Trafford to witness a 2–0 United victory, David May and Brian McClair getting the goals.

League table

Results
Port Vale's score comes first

Football League First Division

Results by matchday

Matches

FA Cup

League Cup

Player statistics

Appearances

Top scorers

Transfers

Transfers in

Transfers out

Loans in

Loans out

References
Specific

General
Soccerbase

Port Vale F.C. seasons
Port Vale